is the second major single (fifth overall) released by Japanese pop rock band Scandal. It was released in two versions: a limited CD+DVD edition and a regular CD-only edition. The title track was used as the 2009 ending theme for the television show "Mecha-Mecha Iketeru!". "Sakura Goodbye" was formerly called "Sakura" when the band performed it live during their indie days. The song has a graduation theme and the single released at the time of MAMI and TOMOMI's high school graduation. Copies of the single purchased at Tower Records came with a limited bonus sleeve from the band's endorsement for Nike Terminator. The single reached #30 on the Oricon weekly chart and charted for seven weeks, selling 6,995 copies.

Track listing

CD

DVD

References 

2009 singles
Music television series theme songs
Scandal (Japanese band) songs
Songs written by Tomomi Ogawa
Epic Records singles